East Carroll Parish is a parish located in the Mississippi Delta in northeastern Louisiana. As of 2020, its population was 7,459. The parish seat is Lake Providence. An area of cotton plantations in the antebellum era, the parish in the early 21st century has about 74% of its land devoted to agriculture.

History
This area is part of the delta along the western edge of the Mississippi River, long subject to the seasonal flooding that gave the area fertile soils. It was occupied by indigenous peoples for thousands of years. European explorers encountered the historic tribes of the Caddo and Choctaw in this area, as well as the Natchez on the east side of the Mississippi River.

In the 1830s, the United States forced out most of the people of the Five Civilized Tribes from the Southeast to west of the Mississippi River in Indian Territory to make way for development by European Americans. Areas along the river were cleared and developed for cultivation of cotton, the major commodity crop in the Deep South before the Civil War. The cotton was cultivated and processed on plantations by large groups of enslaved African-American laborers.

Prior to 1814, all of the territory covered by the current East Carroll Parish was part of the now defunct Warren Parish. The original Carroll Parish, before it was divided into "East" and "West" segments after Reconstruction, was named for Charles Carroll of Carrollton, Maryland, the only Roman Catholic signer of the Declaration of Independence. This and other nearby parishes along the Mississippi River were called the Natchez District, referring to the major port on the Mississippi side of the river. Both areas were developed for cotton plantations.

Given the dependence of plantation agriculture on enslaved workers, the population of this area was majority African American well before the American Civil War. Carroll Parish had 11,000 slaves in 1860, more than three times the white population of the total parish. Most were located on the plantations in the floodplain along the Mississippi River. During the war, many slaves joined Union lines and served in the United States Colored Troops; Louisiana had more former slaves enlisted in the USCT than six other southern states combined.

Carroll Parish covered a large area and the parish was split by the state legislature in 1877, following the Reconstruction era. West Carroll Parish, with territory west of the Bayou Macon, was majority-white and voted Democratic.

After the war, this area continued to be dominated by agriculture and was largely rural. Numerous black Union veterans settled in East Carroll Parish and some owned their own land, especially in an area called Soldiers' Rest, site of a former Union camp. They developed an independent community. With blacks outnumbering whites in Carroll Parish by a seven-to-one margin, and with combat experience, they resisted efforts in the 1870s to suppress their population. Voters in the larger Carroll Parrish elected blacks to the positions of sheriff, state representative, clerk of the court, and several justices of the peace, and hired black constables, giving blacks a voice at the local level.

But white conservative Democrats formed groups noted as Bulldozers, conducting violence against black voters, teachers, and supporters to suppress their activities.  White conservatives succeeded in regaining control of the state legislature by the end of Reconstruction. By creating West Carroll Parish in 1877, they had an additional jurisdiction dominated by white Democrats.

Two decades later, at the end of the 19th century, the state legislature passed a new constitution in 1898 that raised barriers to voter registration, with rules applied against African Americans. They were effectively disenfranchised well into the 1960s. The legislature passed segregation and Jim Crow laws of increasing severity into the early 20th century.

In 1907 U.S. President Theodore Roosevelt came to East Carroll Parish near Lake Providence for a black bear hunt. When a particular bear managed to elude the hunters, the president's camp was moved to Bear Lake in Madison Parish near Tallulah. The 21-year-old Arthur Spencer of Richland Parish took a photograph of Roosevelt with the heavily armed hunting party. Among the hunters was John M. Parker, future governor of Louisiana and the vice-presidential choice of the Bull Moose Party ticket in the 1912 presidential election.

Law and government
From 1922 to 1962, African Americans were prohibited from registering to vote in East Carroll Parish through a combination of laws and practices such as literacy tests. The first African Americans were registered after the ruling in U.S. v. Manning (1962) found that the prohibition of voter registration for Black people violated the Civil Rights Act of 1960.  It was not, however, until the Voting Rights Act of 1965 became law that large numbers of African Americans became registered to vote, and they continued to vote at high levels. They have tended to support Democratic Party candidates, as the national party had supported the civil rights movement. As East Carroll Parish is majority black, its voters still favor Democratic Party candidates. Most conservative whites have shifted since the late 20th century to the Republican Party, which candidates dominate elections in majority-white areas of the state.

In 1988, Governor Michael S. Dukakis of Massachusetts carried East Carroll Parish over then Vice President George Herbert Walker Bush, 1,809 votes (52.3 percent) to 1,536 (44.4 percent).
In the 2004 presidential race, East Carroll gave the Democrat John Kerry - John Edwards slate 1,980 ballots (58 percent) to 1,357 votes (40 percent) for the George W. Bush - Richard B. Cheney slate.

In 2012, U.S. President Barack H. Obama swept the parish with 2,478 votes (61.8 percent) to Republican Mitt Romney's 1,508 (37.6 percent). In 2008, Obama had handily defeated John McCain in East Carroll Parish, 2,267 (63.7 percent) to 1,254 (35.2 percent).

Geography

Major highways
  U.S. Highway 65
  Louisiana Highway 2

Adjacent counties and parishes
 Chicot County, Arkansas  (north)
 Issaquena County, Mississippi  (east)
 Warren County, Mississippi  (southeast)
 Madison Parish  (south)
 Richland Parish  (southwest)
 West Carroll Parish  (west)

Communities

Towns 
 Lake Providence (parish seat and only municipality)

Unincorporated communities 
 Gassoway
 Sondheimer
 Transylvania

Demographics

As of the 2020 United States census, there were 7,459 people, 2,037 households, and 1,193 families residing in the parish.

Economy and poverty data
East Carroll Parish is still largely agricultural, with 74% of its land devoted to crops. As farm labor needs have been reduced by mechanization and farms have been consolidated into larger units, jobs in the area have been reduced. Agriculture may take the form of aquaculture, and row crops.

Of 3,197 counties ranked by the U.S. Census Bureau in 2011 for "estimated percent of people of all ages in poverty", East Carroll Parish was fifth. It was estimated that 44 percent of the rural county's residents lived in poverty.

Education
Public schools in East Carroll Parish are operated by the East Carroll Parish School Board.  In an infographic released by Graphiq, East Carroll Parish is ranked as the least educated parish in Louisiana with 32.29% of 25 year-olds without a high school diploma and 9.4% of 25 year-olds with a bachelor's degree or higher.

Notable people
 Buddy Caldwell, District Attorney of the Sixth Judicial District in East Carroll, elected in 2007 as the attorney general of Louisiana, serving into 2016
 Vail M. Delony, state representative, 1950–1967; Speaker of the Louisiana House, 1964–1967
 John Martin Hamley, state representative, 1912–1924; clerk of the state House, 1924–1931; elected parish tax assessor, 1933`
 William J. Jefferson, former U.S. representative from Louisiana's 2nd congressional district, was born in Lake Providence. He was convicted of corruption in 2012; in 2017, seven of 10 charges against him were dropped and he was released from prison.
 James E. Paxton, district attorney for Louisiana 6th Judicial District (East Carroll, Madison, and Tensas parishes) since 2008
 Francis Xavier Ransdell, state 6th Judicial District judge from 1900 to 1936
 Joseph Ransdell, a Democrat who served in Congress from 1913 to 1931. Ransdell was born in Alexandria but resided for many years in Lake Providence.
 John Henry Scott, born and lived in this parish, worked on civil rights for voting rights of African Americans in the state
 David Voelker, entrepreneur and philanthropist in New Orleans; born in Lake Providence
 Frank Voelker Jr., attorney in Lake Providence and New Orleans; former chairman of the Louisiana Sovereignty Commission; candidate for governor of Louisiana in 1963
 Frank Voelker Sr., judge of the 6th Judicial District, 1937–1963; son-in-law of Judge Francis Ransdell 
 Charles L. Vining Jr., state representative from East and West Carroll parishes, 1968–1972
 Norris C. Williamson, state senator from 1916 to 1932; advocate of cotton planter interest and worked to gain state funding to eradicate the cattle tick
 John D. Winters, historian at Louisiana Tech University, author of The Civil War in Louisiana (1963), was reared in Lake Providence.
 Aaron "Rudy" Threats, the longest serving Chief of Police in the history of Lake Providence, the parish seat of East Carroll Parish.
 General Trass, served as Mayor of Lake Providence and Principal of public school in Lake Providence from 1954 until 1991. The high school was renamed for him after his death.

Gallery

Politics
Unlike neighbouring West Carroll Parish, and Louisiana generally, East Carroll Parish is a Democratic stronghold, owing primarily to its majority African-American population. It was one of just two parishes (the other being Orleans Parish, home to New Orleans) to support the Democratic candidate in the 1999 Louisiana gubernatorial election. Furthermore, in presidential elections, it has not supported a Republican since 1972, when Republican incumbent Richard Nixon carried 63 of the state's 64 parishes, and East Carroll was still Nixon's fourth weakest parish in the state. East Carroll rejected Ronald Reagan in both 1980 and 1984. The last Democratic candidate to win less than 60% of the parish's vote in a presidential was John Kerry, who ran against President George W. Bush of neighboring Texas. Four years prior, in 2000, it had been Al Gore's fourth best parish statewide. However, East Carroll was previously known to support third-party segregationists. In 1948, it gave Strom Thurmond over 60% of the vote (Republican candidate Thomas Dewey won less than a fifth as many votes as Thurmond). In 1960, it gave a plurality to George Wallace of Alabama. And in 1964, the parish gave 85% of its vote to Republican Barry Goldwater, who lost in a landslide to Lyndon Johnson nationally, compared to just 15% for Lyndon Johnson. Before 1964, like most of the south, East Carroll was powerfully Democratic, giving just 3 votes to Republican Charles Evans Hughes, and even giving 77% of its vote to Al Smith, who performed considerably worse in the south than past Democratic candidates, losing traditionally Democratic strongholds including Texas, Florida and North Carolina. More recently, East Carroll has trended further and further Democratic. In fact, in 2012 Barack Obama won more votes than Bill Clinton in 1996, and in 2016 Hillary Clinton won more votes than her husband, Bill Clinton, had won in 1992 (albeit by a very thin margin of three votes).

See also

 National Register of Historic Places listings in East Carroll Parish, Louisiana

References

External links
 East Carroll Parish Sheriff's Office

Further reading

 Sutter, John D. "The most unequal place in America." CNN. October 29, 2013.

 
Louisiana parishes
Louisiana parishes on the Mississippi River
1877 establishments in Louisiana
Populated places established in 1877
Black Belt (U.S. region)
Majority-minority parishes in Louisiana